65 athletes (53 men and 12 women) from Finland competed at the 1996 Summer Paralympics in Atlanta, United States.

Medallists

See also
Finland at the Paralympics
Finland at the 1996 Summer Olympics

References 

Nations at the 1996 Summer Paralympics
1996
Summer Paralympics